Recha (minor planet designation: 573 Recha) is a minor planet orbiting the Sun.  It is in the asteroid belt, orbiting between Mars and Jupiter. The asteroid, discovered by German astronomer Max Wolf on September 19, 1905, was named after a character in Gotthold Ephraim Lessing's play Nathan the Wise and may have been inspired by the asteroid's provisional designation 1905 RC.

Photometric observations at the Palmer Divide Observatory in Colorado Springs, Colorado from 2001 to 2006 were used to build a light curve for this object. The asteroid displayed a rotation period of 7.15 ± 0.01 hours and a brightness variation of 0.20 ± 0.02 in magnitude.

This is a member of the dynamic Eos family of asteroids that most likely formed as the result of a collisional breakup of a parent body.

Between 2005 and 2022, 573 Recha has been observed to occult four stars.

References

External links 
 Lightcurve plot of 573 Recha, Palmer Divide Observatory, B. D. Warner (2005)
 Asteroid Lightcurve Database (LCDB), query form (info )
 Dictionary of Minor Planet Names, Google books
 Asteroids and comets rotation curves, CdR – Observatoire de Genève, Raoul Behrend
 Discovery Circumstances: Numbered Minor Planets (1)-(5000) – Minor Planet Center
 
 

000573
Discoveries by Max Wolf
Named minor planets
19050919